Malus sargentii, the Sargent crabapple or Sargent's apple, is a species of flowering plant in the genus Malus of the family Rosaceae. The species was formerly considered a variety of the species Malus sieboldii.

Malus sargentii is native to Japan but is commonly used as an attractive compact ornamental shrub elsewhere. Every other year it bears masses of pink buds opening to fragrant white blossom. In the autumn, many small red globose fruits appear, persisting on the tree until winter.

Images

References 

sargentii
Crabapples
Endemic flora of Japan
Garden plants of Asia